Saint Clair (alternatively, St. Clair) is an unincorporated community in Hawkins County, Tennessee, United States.
Saint Clair is the location of Saint Clair Elementary School and a Volunteer Fire Department.

References

Unincorporated communities in Hawkins County, Tennessee
Unincorporated communities in Tennessee